Eucereon marica is a moth of the subfamily Arctiinae. It was described by Pieter Cramer in 1775. It is found in the Amazon region.

References

 

marica
Moths described in 1775
Taxa named by Pieter Cramer